The 2015–16 Moldovan Cup is the 25th season of the Moldovan annual football tournament. The competition began on 22 August 2015 with the first preliminary round and will end with the final held in May 2016. The winner of the competition will qualify for the first qualifying round of the 2016–17 UEFA Europa League.

Participating teams
Following teams will take part in 2015–16 2015–16 Moldovan Cup.

Roman number in brackets denote the level of respective league in Football in Moldova

First preliminary round
Entering this round are 26 clubs from the Moldovan "B" Division. These matches took place on 22, 23 August 2015.

|}

Second preliminary round
Entering this round are 6 clubs from the Moldovan "B" Division. These matches took place on 29, 30 August 2015.

|}

First round
Entering this round are 22 clubs from the Moldovan "B" Division and Moldovan "A" Division. These matches took place on 13 September 2015.

|}

Second round
Entering this round are 10 clubs from the Moldovan "B" Division and Moldovan "A" Division. These matches took place on 22 and 23 September 2015.

|}

Third round

Entering this round are 16 clubs from the Moldovan National Division and Moldovan "A" Division. These matches took place on 27 and 28 October 2015.

|}

{{Footballbox collapsible
|bg = 
|date = 28 October 2015
|time = 
|team1 = Dinamo-Auto Tiraspol (1)
|score = 5–1
|aet=
|report = 
|team2 = 'Codru Lozova (2)
|goals1 = V. Ivanov Cemîrtan Pîslă 
|goals2 = I. Cebotari 
|stadium = Dinamo-Auto Stadium
|location = Tîrnauca
|attendance = 
|referee = V. Banari
}}

Quarterfinals
Entering this round are 8 clubs from the Moldovan National Division. These matches took place on 19 and 20 April 2016.

|}

Semifinals
These matches took place on 10 May 2016.

|}

Final
The final was scheduled to be played on 25 May 2016 at Zimbru Stadium. The "home" team (for administrative purposes) was determined by an additional draw held on 12 May 2016.

|}

Top goalscorersUpdated to matches played on 26 May 2016.''

Hat-tricks

Note
4 Player scored 4 goals

References

External links
2015-2016 la soccerway

Moldovan Cup seasons
Cup
Moldova